Robati (also Romanized as Robāţī; also known as Robāţ) is a village in Takht-e Jolgeh Rural District, in the Central District of Firuzeh County, Razavi Khorasan Province, Iran. At the 2006 census, its population was 135, in 32 families.

References 

Populated places in Firuzeh County